Lepic may refer to:

People
 Ludovic-Napoléon Lepic (1839–1889), French artist, archaeologist and patron of the arts. 
 Ermin Lepić, (known as Lepa) is a Bosnian volleyball player.
 Louis Lepic (1765-1827), French cavalry commander of the French Revolutionary and Napoleonic Wars.
 Hugues Lepic (born 1965), private equity professional and investor.

Other
 Count Lepic and His Daughters, a painting by Edgar Degas.
 View of Paris from Vincent's Room in the Rue Lepic 
 Rue Lepic, ancient road in the commune of Montmartre, France.

See also
 Lepic (surname)